Hollander is a surname.

Hollander may also refer to:
 Hollander beater, a paper pulp machine
 Dutch rabbit
 A breed of domestic pigeon
 A brand of infant and child nutrition in New Zealand.

See also 

 Den Hollander